Prime Minister's Children (Hebrew: ילדי ראש הממשלה; Yaldei Rosh HaMemshala) is an Israeli political drama television series. It tells the story of the fictional Prime Minister Saul Agmon, and the impact of his highly position on his family, especially his children.

Thirteen episodes, divided into two seasons, have been produced. The series was first shown in Israel in the summer of 2011. The series follows the fictional prime minister, Shaul Agmon, in his first year in office. The entrance to the Prime Minister's Office changes the lives of his wife Diti and children Libi and Golan dramatically. After the appointment of Shaul they are now under the public magnifying glass. Each character feels that they are comes to their own private prison, including guards, cameras. Now they are looking for the strength to break it. In addition, the series shows the process of growing up of two women, the wife of the prime minister and his eldest daughter.

Cast
Rami Heuberger - Prime Minister Shaul Agmon
Michaela Eshet	- Yehudit 'Diti' Agmon
Alona Tal - Libi Agmon
Lee Biran - Golan Agmon
Evelin Hagoel - Amalia Bilchik
Marina Maximilian Blumin - Alin
Gila Almagor - Rachel Agmon
Sharon Alexander - Hilik
Itay Turgeman - Kobi Dahan
Lior Raz - Asael
Efrat Aviv - Iris
Shmuel Atzmon - Shimon Agmon
Nina Kotler - Yardena

External links
Prime Minister's Children on IMDb
Official Website

Israeli political television series
Television series about journalism
Television series about television
Channel 2 (Israeli TV channel) original programming
Political drama films
2010 Israeli television series debuts
2012 Israeli television series endings
Fictional prime ministers
Television series about prime ministers